Nufonia Must Fall is a graphic novel written by prominent turntablist Kid Koala. The book is accompanied by a CD soundtrack, produced by Kid Koala. It is published by ECW Press.

External links
Ninja Tunes press release
Review at Popmatters
Review at BBC Collective

Kid Koala albums
American graphic novels
ECW Press books